The following is a list of the exports of France. Data is for 2019, in millions of United States dollars, as reported by International Trade Centre. Currently the top thirty exports are listed.

See also
Economy of France
List of exports of the United Kingdom

References
 International Trade Centre - International Trade Statistics (2019) - Monthly, quarterly and yearly trade data. Import & export values, volumes, growth rates, market shares, etc.

Foreign trade of France
France
Exports